In computing, a directory structure is the way an operating system arranges files that are accessible to the user. Files are typically displayed in a hierarchical tree structure.

File names and extensions
A filename is a string used to uniquely identify a file stored on this structure. Before the advent of 32-bit operating systems, file names were typically limited to short names (6 to 14 characters in size). Modern operating systems now typically allow much longer filenames (more than 250 characters per pathname element).

Windows, DOS and OS/2

In DOS, Windows, and OS/2, the root directory is "drive:\", for example, the root directory is usually "C:\". The directory separator is usually a "\", but the operating system also internally recognizes a "/". Physical and virtual drives are named by a drive letter, as opposed to being combined as one. This means that there is no "formal" root directory, but rather that there are independent root directories on each drive. However, it is possible to combine two drives into one virtual drive letter, by setting a hard drive into a RAID setting of 0.

Windows 10
The following folders may appear in the root of a boot partition.

Unix

Unix and Unix-like operating systems use the Filesystem Hierarchy Standard as the common form for their directory structures. All files and directories appear under the root directory "/", even if they are stored on different physical devices.

See also
 File system
 Path (computing)

References

Computer file systems
Structure